HAT-P-33 (2MASS J07324421+335006, GSC 2461-00988) is a late-F dwarf star. It is orbited by a planet called HAT-P-33b.
A search for a binary companion star using adaptive optics at the MMT Observatory was negative.

Planetary system
The transiting hot Jupiter exoplanet orbiting HAT-P-33 was discovered by the HATNet Project in 2011. An effort to detect transit timing variations due to other planets found none.

References

F-type main-sequence stars
Planetary systems with one confirmed planet
Planetary transit variables
Gemini (constellation)